Events during the year 2012 in Poland.

Incumbents

Events

March 
3 March – Szczekociny rail crash

Deaths 

5 March – Marek Kuszewski, fencer (born 1933).
7 September – Leszek Drogosz, boxer and actor (born 1933).
10 October – Piotr Lenartowicz, philosopher (born 1934).
11 October – Edward Kossoy, lawyer, publicist and activist for victims of Nazism (born 1913).
17 November – Henryk Grzybowski, footballer (born 1934)

See also 
 2012 in Polish television

References 

 
Poland
pl:2012#Wydarzenia w Polsce